Zodarion lusitanicum is a spider species found in Portugal and Spain.

See also 
 List of Zodariidae species

References

External links 

lusitanicum
Spiders described in 2003
Spiders of Europe
Fauna of Portugal
Fauna of Spain